Francis Creek is a stream in Manitowoc County, Wisconsin, in the United States.

History
Francis Creek was named after Francis of Assisi.

See also
List of rivers of Wisconsin

References

Rivers of Manitowoc County, Wisconsin
Rivers of Wisconsin